The white-rumped cuckooshrike (Coracina leucopygia) is a species of bird in the family Campephagidae. It is endemic to Sulawesi, Indonesia.

References

white-rumped cuckooshrike
Endemic birds of Sulawesi
white-rumped cuckooshrike
white-rumped cuckooshrike
Taxonomy articles created by Polbot